Abbey Presbyterian Church is a church located at Parnell Square, Dublin. The church was erected in 1864 with funding from Alexander Findlater, a Dublin merchant, and is known colloquially as "Findlater's church".

One of the first preachers was John Hall (1829–1898).

References

External links 
 Abbey Presbyterian Church
 Irish Architecture site with images

Parnell Square
Presbyterian churches in Dublin (city)